Sir Mark Sykes, 1st Baronet (9 May 1711 - 14 September 1783) was a priest in the Church of England, Rector of Roos in the East Riding of Yorkshire. Sykes was created a baronet in 1783, shortly before his death; the baronetcy was originally designed for his son Christopher, who insisted it be conferred upon his father.

He married Decima Woodham, daughter of Twyford Woodham of Ely on 9 March 1735. Their marriage bore them a son, Sir Christopher Sykes, 2nd Baronet.

In 1761 he inherited Sledmere House and its large estate from his elder brother, Sir Richard Sykes. He was succeeded by his son, Christopher.

See also
 Sykes family of Sledmere

References

1711 births
1783 deaths
Baronets in the Baronetage of Great Britain
English Christian religious leaders